There's a Riot Going On is the fifteenth full-length studio album by the American band Yo La Tengo, and was released through Matador Records on March 16, 2018.

There's a Riot Going On was ranked the 41st best release of the year in The Wire magazine's annual critics' poll.

The title of the album is derived from the 1971 Sly and the Family Stone album There's a Riot Goin' On.

Track listing

Charts

References

2018 albums
Matador Records albums
Yo La Tengo albums